Indira Gandhi was sworn in as Prime Minister of India for the third time on 14 January 1980.

Indira Gandhi's cabinet included 6 Agriculturists, 9 Lawyers, 2 Journalists and 1 former Princely state rulers.

Three of Gandhi's cabinet ministers namely Pranab Mukherjee, R. Venkataraman and Zail Singh later served as Presidents of India.

Cabinet

Key
  Died in office
  Resigned

|}

Ministers of State
 Shivraj Patil, Ministry of Defence, Ministry of Science and Technology, Ministry of Atomic Energy, Ministry of Electronics, Ministry of Space and Ocean Development.
 Shivraj Patil, Ministry of Commerce (Independent Charge).
 Saroj Khaparde, Ministry of Family Welfare (1980–82)
 S.K. Kamla Kumari, Ministry of Agriculture (1980–83)
 Ram Dulari Sinha, Ministry of Commerce (1980–82), Ministry of Industry, Steel and Mines (1982–84)
 Tanguturi Anjaiah, Ministry of Labour (8 June 1980 – 10 October 1980)
 Ashok Gehlot
 C. K. Jaffer Sharief, Minister of Railways (1980-1984)
 Charanjit Chanana,  Minister of Industry
 Baleshwar Ram, Ministry of Agriculture (1980–84)
shri Dharam Vir, Deputy  Minister  in  the  Ministry  of Labour (15.1.1982 to 6.9.1982), Deputy  Minister  in  the  Ministry  of Labour and Rehabilitation (6.9.1982 to 29.1.1983),Minister  of  State  in  the  Ministry  of Labour and Rehabilitation(29.1.1983 to 31.10.1984* and Again from 4.11.1984 to 22.12.1984)

See also

 List of Indian union ministries

References

Indian union ministries
Indira Gandhi administration
1980 establishments in India
1984 disestablishments in India
Cabinets established in 1980
Cabinets disestablished in 1984
1980 in Indian politics